Massachusetts House of Representatives' 1st Franklin district in the United States is one of 160 legislative districts included in the lower house of the Massachusetts General Court. It covers parts of Franklin County and Hampshire County. Democrat Natalie Blais of Sunderland has represented the district since 2019. Blais is running unopposed for re-election in the 2020 Massachusetts general election.

Towns represented
The district includes the following localities:
 Ashfield
 Buckland
 Chester
 Chesterfield
 Conway
 Cummington
 Deerfield
 Goshen
 Huntington
 Leverett
 Middlefield
 Montague
 Plainfield
 Shelburne
 Shutesbury
 Sunderland
 Whately
 Williamsburg
 Worthington

The current district geographic boundary overlaps with those of the Massachusetts Senate's Berkshire, Hampshire, Franklin and Hampden and Hampshire, Franklin and Worcester districts.

Former locales
The district previously covered:
 Bernardston, circa 1927 
 Charlemont, circa 1927 
 Colrain, circa 1927 
 Hawley, circa 1927 
 Heath, circa 1927 
 Leyden, circa 1927 
 Monroe, circa 1927 
 New Salem, circa 1872 
 Northfield, circa 1927 
 Orange, circa 1872 
 Rowe, circa 1927 
 Warwick, circa 1872

Representatives
 Pliny Fisk, circa 1858 
 Hugh B. Miller, circa 1859 
 George D. Wells, circa 1858-1859 
 Freeman C. Griswold, circa 1888 
 Charles Elmer, circa 1908
 Albert Bray, circa 1918
 Walter H. Kemp, circa 1920 
 Elisha Hooper, circa 1923
 Fred Dole, circa 1935
 George Fuller, circa 1945
 Philip F. Whitmore, circa 1951 
 Winston Healy, circa 1970
 Jonathan L. Healy, 1971–1993 
 Stephen Kulik, 1993–2019
 Natalie M. Blais, 2019-current

See also
 Massachusetts House of Representatives' 2nd Franklin district
 List of Massachusetts House of Representatives elections
 List of Massachusetts General Courts
 List of former districts of the Massachusetts House of Representatives

Images

References

External links

 Ballotpedia
  (State House district information based on U.S. Census Bureau's American Community Survey).
 League of Women Voters of Franklin County
 Amherst League of Women Voters

House
Government of Franklin County, Massachusetts
Government of Hampshire County, Massachusetts